Jakob Flach (1894–1982) was a Swiss painter.

External links

References
This article was initially translated from the German Wikipedia.

20th-century Swiss painters
Swiss male painters
1894 births
1982 deaths
20th-century Swiss male artists